Katherine Bennett may refer to:

 Katherine Bennett (athletics) (1922–2009), African-American pioneer for women's collegiate athletics
 Katherine Bennett (comedian) (born 1976), British comedian

See also 
 Catherine Bennett (disambiguation)